Van Doren is a toponymic surname of Dutch origin and a variation of Van Doorn. Notable people with the surname include:

 Carl Clinton Van Doren (1885–1950), Pulitzer Prize-winning biographer, brother of Mark Van Doren
 Charles Van Doren (1926–2019), quiz show contestant, professor and Encyclopædia Britannica editor, son of Mark Van Doren
 Dorothy Van Doren (1896–1993), American novelist, wife of Mark Van Doren
 Howard Van Doren Shaw (1869–1926), American architect
 Irita Bradford Van Doren (1891–1966), American literary figure and editor of the New York Herald Tribune, wife of Carl Clinton Van Doren
 Philip Van Doren Stern (1900–1984), American author and Civil War historian
 Mamie Van Doren (b. 1931), American actress
 Mark Van Doren (1894–1972), Pulitzer Prize-winning poet and critic, brother of Carl Clinton Van Doren
 Paul Van Doren (1930–2021), American businessman
 Sally Van Doren, American poet

See also
 Vandoren, the reed manufacturing company
 Van Dooren
 Van Doorn
 Van Dorn

Dutch-language surnames
Surnames of Dutch origin